The Coors Light Cash Spiel was an annual bonspiel, or curling tournament, held as part of the men's World Curling Tour. The event was held in November and took place at the Duluth Curling Club in Duluth, Minnesota. It was held in conjunction with the Molson Cash Spiel on the women's World Curling Tour.

Past champions
Only skip's name is displayed.

External links
Duluth Curling Club website

Former World Curling Tour events
Curling in Minnesota
Sports in Duluth, Minnesota
Ontario Curling Tour events